Judson Huss (8 May 1942 – 25 July 2008), born Clifford Judson Huss, was an American-born painter and sculptor of fantastic art.

Born in Durham, North Carolina, he later moved with his family to Los Angeles, California where he began to study art. He was also a rock musician, playing guitar and bass with many bands, including Smith. He relocated to Paris in the mid 1970s, where he began to paint full-time. He was represented by the Morpheus Gallery, and through that gallery published River of Mirrors (1996), a retrospective book of his art.

See also
 Fantastic art

References

1942 births
2008 deaths
Fantastic art
20th-century American painters
American male painters
21st-century American painters
People from Durham, North Carolina
20th-century American sculptors
20th-century American male artists
American male sculptors